Oton Vinski (born Otto Weiss; 20 March 1877 – 1942) was an influential Croatian banker who was killed during the Holocaust.

Vinski was born in Osijek on 20 March 1877, as Otto Weiss, to a Jewish family of Franjo and Berta Weiss. Vinski was married to Štefanija (née Alexander) Vinski, of the notable Zagreb Jewish family, Alexander. Together they had two sons: Zdenko and Ivo. In 1918, Vinski changed his name and surname. He was employed as a procurator and chief executive of the "Croatian Discount Bank" in Zagreb. During World War II, Vinski was arrested and deported to Jasenovac concentration camp together with his mother in law Ilka Alexander, where they were both killed in 1942. When his wife returned home, nobody was left. By mere chance Vinski's wife and sons have survived the Holocaust. His wife died in Zagreb 1959.

References

Bibliography

 

1877 births
1942 deaths
People from Osijek
Croatian Jews who died in the Holocaust
Austro-Hungarian Jews
Croatian Austro-Hungarians
Croatian bankers
Croatian businesspeople
Alexander family (Croatia)
Croatian civilians killed in World War II
People who died in Jasenovac concentration camp
Croatian people executed in Nazi concentration camps
Yugoslav bankers